Ypsolopha nigrimaculata is a moth of the family Ypsolophidae. It is known from Korea and the Russian Far East.

The length of the forewings is about 11 mm.

References

Moths described in 2001
Ypsolophidae
Moths of Asia